The Nagar District is one of the 14 districts of Pakistan-administered territory of Gilgit-Baltistan. The Nagar District was established in 2015 by the division of the Hunza–Nagar District into two districts: the Hunza District and the Nagar District. The Nagar District is bounded on the north and north-east by the Hunza District, on the south-east by the Shigar District, on the south by the Gilgit District, and on the west by the Gupis-Yasin District. The district headquarters in the town of Nagarkhas.

Administration
The District Nagar administratively comprises two Tehsils, Tehsil Nagar-I and Tehsil Nagar-II. All the villages of upper Nagar including Shayar, Askurdas, Sumayar, Nagarkhas, Hoper Valley, and Hispar come under the Tehsil Nagar-I. While all the villages of lower Nagar including Bar, Chalt, Buladas, Chaprote, Skandarabad, Jafarabad, Nilt, Thol, Ghulmet, Pisan, Minapin, Meacher, Dadhimal, Phekar, and Hakuchar are the par of Tehsil Nagar-II.

Political representation
At the provincial level, the district is represented by two elected members to Gilgit-Baltistan Legislative Assembly according to the following constituencies: 
GBLA-4 (Nagar-II)
GBLA-5 (Nagar-I)

See also
 Nagar Valley
 Hopar Valley
 Sumayar Valley
 Hisper Valley
 Gilgit District

References

 
Districts of Gilgit-Baltistan